Paul J. Drucker (born April 17, 1945) is an American politician and former member of the Pennsylvania House of Representatives. He represented the 157th district from 2009 through 2010 as a Democrat.

Professional career
Drucker is a practicing attorney. He has held a variety of positions, including working in the district attorney's office under future Senator Arlen Specter. Drucker has worked as a lecturer, and as a judge pro tem for the Philadelphia Common Pleas Court. He is also certified mediator in U.S. District Court, a Hearing Committee member of the Disciplinary Board of the state Supreme Court and a member of the board of directors of the First Bank of Philadelphia.

Political career

Township Supervisor
In December 2005, Drucker won a special election to fill a two-year term on the Tredyffrin Township Board of Supervisors. He was the first Democrat to win political office in the township's 300-year history. Drucker lost his bid for re-election in 2007.

State House career

2008 election campaign
On November 4, 2008, he was elected to the State House, succeeding retiring Republican Carole Rubley. He defeated his opponent, Guy Ciarrocchi, by a margin of 50.9% to 49.1%.

The race was considered one of the nastiest and most expensive in the state. Both candidates launched websites attacking one another. Ciarrocchi, then-Chief of Staff to Congressman Jim Gerlach, attacked Drucker's legal career through a website called "slip and fall Paul". Drucker's campaign attacked Ciarrocchi's political background through a website called "what kind of Guy". In the end, Drucker narrowly defeated his opponent in a count that stretched into the morning following election day.

2010 re-election campaign
Drucker was defeated in his bid for re-election by Republican Warren Kampf.

Committee service
Drucker served on the Aging and Older Adult Services Committee, as well as the Children and Youth, Health and Human Services and Judiciary Committees while in the House.

2012 election campaign
Drucker ran against incumbent Warren Kampf in an attempt to regain his seat in the 2012 election. Kampf narrowly won re-election by a margin of 51% to 49%.

References

External links 

Follow the Money - Paul Drucker
2008

Democratic Party members of the Pennsylvania House of Representatives
Living people
People from Paoli, Pennsylvania
1967 births
21st-century American politicians
Politicians from Chester County, Pennsylvania